Marion Street Area Historic District is a national historic district located at Rock Hill, South Carolina.  It encompasses 28 contributing buildings and 1 contributing site in a middle-class residential section of Rock Hill. The bulk of the district developed between 1906 and 1925. Architectural styles represented include Victorian, Classical Revival, Colonial Revival, and Bungalow.  Notable buildings include the Rawlinson House (c. 1874–1875), McCall-Jones-Byrant House (c. 1900), Davis House, and W. B. Jenkins House (c. 1920).

It was listed on the National Register of Historic Places in 1992.

References

Historic districts on the National Register of Historic Places in South Carolina
Houses on the National Register of Historic Places in South Carolina
Victorian architecture in South Carolina
Colonial Revival architecture in South Carolina
Neoclassical architecture in South Carolina
Buildings and structures in Rock Hill, South Carolina
National Register of Historic Places in Rock Hill, South Carolina
Houses in York County, South Carolina